The Greece men's Under-21 national basketball team (Greek Young Men National Basketball Team), represents Greece in international Under-21 age basketball competitions, and it is organized and run by the Hellenic Basketball Federation (E.O.K.) The Greece men's Under-21 national basketball team played at the FIBA Under-21 World Cup.

FIBA Under-21 World Cup

Under